Gobind Malhi (1921-2001) was an Indian writer who wrote in the Sindhi-language. 

Malhi He was born in 1921, in Nawabshah District in a small village Tharushah, in a Hindu Zamindar family.

Books
Sindhi Kahani Chayanika, Pakhira Valar Khan Vichuria
 Inqalabi Sipahi
 Aansun, Sargam Sahitya
 Zindagi Ji Rah Te, novel
 Sharam Booti, Sathi Sahitya
 Jeevan Sathi, novel

References

Sindhi-language writers
Sindhi people
Indian male writers
1921 births
2001 deaths